The 12th South American Junior Championships in Athletics were held in São Paulo, Brazil, between December 15–17, 1978.

Participation (unofficial)
Detailed result lists can be found on the "World Junior Athletics History" website.  An unofficial count yields the number of about 178 athletes from about 8 countries:  Argentina (33), Bolivia (6), Brazil (53), Chile (42), Colombia (13), Paraguay (8), Peru (9), Uruguay (14).

Medal summary
Medal winners are published for men and women
Complete results can be found on the "World Junior Athletics History" website.

Men

Women

Medal table (unofficial)

References

External links
World Junior Athletics History

South American U20 Championships in Athletics
South American Junior Championships
South American Junior Championships
International sports competitions in São Paulo
International athletics competitions hosted by Brazil
South American Junior Championships